Love Between the Raindrops is a 1979 Czech drama film directed by Karel Kachyňa. The film was selected as the Czechoslovak entry for the Best Foreign Language Film at the 53rd Academy Awards, but was not accepted as a nominee.

Cast
 Eduard Cupák as Narrator (voice)
 Vladimír Menšík as Vincenc Bursík
 Lukáš Vaculík as Kajda Bursík
 Michal Dlouhý as Young Kajda Bursík
 Jan Hrušínský as Pepan Bursík
 David Vlček as Young Pepan Bursík
 Zlata Adamovská as Věra Bursíková - Daughter
 Lucie Zedníčková as Young Věra Bursíková (as Lucie Bártová)
 Eva Jakoubková as Fanka Bursíková
 Tereza Pokorná as Pája
 Rudolf Hrušínský as Druggist
 Miroslav Macháček as Ráb - Druggist friend

See also
 List of submissions to the 53rd Academy Awards for Best Foreign Language Film
 List of Czechoslovak submissions for the Academy Award for Best Foreign Language Film

References

External links
 

1979 films
1979 comedy films
Czech comedy films
Czechoslovak comedy films
1970s Czech-language films
Films directed by Karel Kachyňa
1970s Czech films